Yilan County is a county of Heilongjiang Province, Northeast China, it is under the administration of the prefecture-level city of Harbin, the capital of Heilongjiang. Its county seat, which is also called Yilan (Yilan Town, Yilan zhen), is located near the confluence of the Mudan River (formerly known as the Hurka River) with the Sungari. The easternmost county-level division of Harbin City, it borders Fangzheng County to the southwest, Tonghe County to the west, as well as the prefecture-level cities of Yichun to the north, Jiamusi to the northeast, Qitaihe to the southeast, and Mudanjiang to the south.

Transportation

China National Highway 221
Station on the Harbin-Jiamusi intercity railway is located in the Sijianfang district, 5 km from town center.

History

During the rule of the Ming dynasty in China, Yilan, formerly known as Sanxing (三姓; Wade–Giles: San-hsing; historically also Romanized as San Sing), was one of the two important centers of the Jianzhou Jurchens of the Hurka River valley. (The other center was Ninguta in the upper reaches of the Hurka). Its Jurchen name was Ilantumen.

The town retained its importance into the Qing period, and in 1692 became the seat of a deputy lieutenant-general. Subordinated to the governor general (jiangjun) in Jilin City. the Sanxing fu dutong was in control of the northeastern section of Jilin Province (which in those days was much larger than now) – a large region stretching northeast along the Sungari and the Amur to the Pacific Ocean.

In 1887, three British travelers – H. E. M. James, Francis Younghusband and Harry English Fulford – visited Sanxing on their tour of Manchuria. According to Fulford's account, the town had the population of around 10,000, trade in furs and fish (salmon and sturgeon) being its main industries.

Lu Houmin, who was the official photographer for the top Chinese leaders particularly Mao Zedong from 1950 to 1964 was born in Yilan.

Climate

Administrative divisions 
Yilan County is divided into 6 towns, 2 townships and 1 ethnic township. 
6 towns
 Yilan, Dalianhe, Jiangwan, Sandaogang, Daotaiqiao, Hongkeli
2 townships
 Tuanshanzi, Yugong
1 ethnic township
 Yinglan Korean

References

External links
Official website of Yilan County government

Districts of Harbin